F.Y.I. - For Your Information is an Indian interactive game show hosted by Jamie Lever, a stand-up comedian and the daughter of Johny Lever. The series is a Flipkart Video original created by Indian Storytellers and directed by Ritika Bajaj. It was released on the Flipkart app on 16 January 2021.

Format 
F.Y.I is a Hindi-language daily game show with each episode lasting 3–4 minutes. In every episode, the host asks three questions to the audience and four options are given for each one. These questions are based on pop culture, general knowledge, sports, politics and social media etc. Participants need to answer all three questions correctly to be eligible for the prizes. Winners will be announced at the end of each episode.

Cast 
The series marks the web debut of Jamie Lever who is the daughter of a noted comedian and Bollywood actor Johnny Lever. She will be seen playing a journalist who is keen, curious, and consistently on the chase for the most recent scoop.

Production 
The show's launch was announced with a teaser trailer in the mid of January on Flipkart Video's YouTube followed by the official promo which was launched on the 15th of January 2021.

References

External links 
 

Indian game shows
Indian web series
2021 web series debuts
Hindi-language web series
Interactive films
2021 Indian television series debuts
Indian reality television series
Flipkart